Route 780 is a  long mostly west–east secondary highway in the southwestern portion of New Brunswick, Canada.

Route description
The route, also known as Old Saint John Road, is mostly in Charlotte County.

The route's western terminus is in the community of Upper Letang at the western terminus of Route 172 and exit 56 of Route 1. From here, it travels north past Lake Utopia at Woodbury Cove before crossing Route 785 in Utopia. It then travels east through wooded and farm areas past Shaw Lake to a crossing of the Pocologan River. The route continues and crosses the New River as it enters New River. It then passes through a mostly forested area before crossing Route 1 and ending in Lepreau at Route 795 near the Lepreau River.

History

See also

References

780
780